The Al Madinah class are a series of four frigates built for the Royal Saudi Navy. The ships are named after Saudi cities. The first, Al Madinah was commissioned in 1985, and the fourth, Taif was commissioned in 1986. The four Al Madinah-class frigates are based in the Red Sea.

Description
The frigates were ordered in October 1980 as part of the "Sawari" programme. The Al Madinah class was built in France at the Arsenal de Marine, Lorient (French Government Dockyard and CNIM, La Seyne in the mid-1980s. Their full load displacement is 2,610 tons and they are armed with eight Otomat surface-to-surface missiles, one 8-cell Crotale surface-to-air missile launcher, with 26 missiles total. The vessels are also armed with one 100 mm/55 dual purpose gun, two 40 mm anti-aircraft guns, four torpedo tubes. The frigates have an aft helicopter deck and hangar for use by one Dauphin helicopter.

Ships in class

Service history
In August 2013, the Kingdom of Saudi Arabia and the French ODAS agency signed a contract to upgrade and modernize the Al Madinah-class frigates.

On 30 January 2017, Al Madinah was attacked by Yemeni Houthi militia along the western coast of Yemen in the Red Sea. Two Saudi sailors were killed and three injured in the attack.

Citations

Further reading
  Also published as 

Ships of the Royal Saudi Navy
Frigate classes